Mucky Foot Productions Limited was a British video game developer, which existed from 1997 to 2003.

History
The company was founded in 1997 in Guildford, United Kingdom by three ex-Bullfrog developers: Mike Diskett, Fin McGechie and Guy Simmons. They intended to avoid the expansion and corporate atmosphere that had taken over at Bullfrog. Another ex-Bullfrog stalwart, Gary Carr, joined as the fourth director shortly afterwards.

A worldwide publishing deal with the UK publisher Eidos was announced in October 1997. That announcement was also used to announce Mucky Foot's first game Urban Chaos. At this point the game was referred to by its earlier work in progress name of Dark City.

Over their lifetime Mucky Foot went on to release two more titles: Startopia and Blade II.

Despite high initial expectations, the company closed its doors in late 2003. This company closure saw six further games cease development while still only part produced like Bulletproof Monk, The Punisher, and Urban Chaos 2.

After the company closed, their official website remained active. However, its content at closure was replaced with the developer's internal quote sheet.

In May 2017 Mucky Foot's Mike Diskett released the source code of Urban Chaos under the MIT license on GitHub.

Games

References

External links 
 Mucky Foot game list at GameSpot

Defunct video game companies of the United Kingdom
Video game companies established in 1997
Video game companies disestablished in 2003
Companies based in Guildford
Defunct companies based in Surrey
Video game development companies
1997 establishments in England
2003 disestablishments in England